Frances Greville née Macartney (c 1724 – 1789) was an Irish poet and celebrity in Georgian England.

She was born in Longford, Ireland in the mid-1720s; one of four daughters of James Macartney and Catherine (née Coote), daughter of the eminent judge Thomas Coote and niece of Richard Coote, 1st Earl of Bellomont.

By the early 1740s, she was in London, accompanying Sarah Lennox, Duchess of Richmond. Horace Walpole's poem The Beauties (1746) mentions her as "Fanny" among the most prominent women at court.

Frances married Fulke Greville of Wilbury House (Wiltshire) in 1748 after an elopement. Greville was a gambler and a dandy, but that he loved his wife is witnessed by her presence (under the character of "Flora" in his Maxims, Characters, and Reflections (1756)). Frances is believed to have contributed to the volume herself.

Frances Greville's own career as an amateur poet was marked by one resounding success: her poem, "Prayer for Indifference", first published in the Edinburgh Chronicle, in 1759, offers an attack on the cult of sensibility. It was reprinted regularly in the following decades, often paired with a poem in praise of sensibility. Her output otherwise was light, and mostly within the confines of vers de société.

She spent the 1760s and 1770s in travel. Her husband was named envoy to Bavaria in 1764. She was a known conversationalist, befriending Charles and Frances Burney, as well as Richard Brinsley Sheridan, who dedicated his The Critic to her.

Her daughter, Frances Anne Crewe, (1748–1818), became a prominent Whig hostess. Her three sons William (1751–1837), Henry (1760–1816) and Charles (1762–1832) had military careers. Henry later became a theatrical manager, with limited success.

Frances died in 1789 at Hampton Court Green.

References

Fuller, Joyce, ed. British Women Poets, 1660-1800. Troy, New York: Whitson Publishing Company, 1990.
Lonsdale, Roger. Eighteenth Century Women Poets. Oxford: Oxford University Press, 1989.

External links

 Frances Greville at the Eighteenth-Century Poetry Archive (ECPA)
 Betty Rizzo, ‘Greville , Frances (1727?–1789)’, Oxford Dictionary of National Biography, (Oxford University Press, Sept 2004; online edn, Jan 2008) , accessed 15 Sept 2008.  
 
 

1724 births
1789 deaths
English women poets
Irish women poets
People from County Longford
Frances
18th-century English women writers
18th-century Irish women writers
18th-century English women
18th-century English people